Zapote amarillo is a common name for three separate tree species native to Central America:

Couepia polyandra, also known as olosapo or baboon cap
Licania platypus, also known as sansapote or sun sapote
Pouteria campechiana, also known as canistel or cupcake fruit